Sphaerodactylus goniorhynchus,  also known as the Jamaican forest sphaero or  Cakoarita least gecko, is a species of lizard in the family Sphaerodactylidae . It is endemic to Jamaica.

References

Sphaerodactylus
Reptiles of Jamaica
Endemic fauna of Jamaica
Reptiles described in 1895